Antonio Maria Graziani (1537–1611) was a Roman Catholic prelate who served as Bishop of Amelia (1592–1611) and Apostolic Nuncio to Venice (1596–1598).

Biography
Antonio Maria Graziani was born in 1537 in Sansepolcro, Italy.
On 17 Feb 1592, he was appointed during the papacy of Pope Clement VIII as Bishop of Amelia.
On 25 Feb 1592, he was consecrated bishop by Antonmaria Sauli, Cardinal-Priest of San Vitale, with Fabio Biondi, Titular Patriarch of Jerusalem, and Fantino Petrignani, Archbishop Emeritus of Cosenza, serving as co-consecrators. 
On 23 Feb 1596, he was appointed during the papacy of Pope Clement VIII as Apostolic Nuncio to Venice; he resigned from the position on 8 Oct 1598.
He served as Bishop of Amelia until his death on 1 Apr 1611.

While bishop, he was the principal co-consecrator of Roberto Pierbenedetti, Bishop of Nocera Umbra (1592).

Notes

Bibliography and external links

Lettere di Pieter de Witte. Pietro Candido nei carteggi di Antonio Maria Graziani (1569-1574), edizione critica di Massimo Moretti, Roma, De Luca Editori d'Arte, 2012.
Moretti, Massimo, 'Ottaviano Mascarino e Antonio Maria Graziani vescovo di Amelia (1592-1611)', in 'I Petrignani di Amelia: Fasti, committenze, collezioni, tra Roma e l’Umbria', San Gabriele-Isola del Gran Sasso, Edizioni Stauròs, 2012, pp. 117-121, pp. 223-252.
Moretti, Massimo, I fratelli Alberti pittori di Sansepolcro, i Petrignani e Antonio Maria Graziani', in 'I Petrignani di Amelia: Fasti, committenze, collezioni, tra Roma e l'Umbria', San Gabriele-Isola del Gran Sasso, Edizioni Stauròs, 2012, pp. 253-257.
Moretti, Massimo,«Quel ritratto di V. S. R.ma»: Domenico Tintoretto e il nunzio a Venezia Antonio Maria Graziani (1537-1611), in “Storia dell’arte”, 2012, 132, pp. 38-45.
Moretti, Massimo, Committenti, intermediari e pittori tra Roma e Venezia attorno al 1600. I ritratti di Domenico Tintoretto per il nunzio Graziani e una perduta Pentecoste di Palma il Giovane per Fabio Biondi, in “Storia dell'arte”, 2015, 141, pp. 21-42.
 (for Chronology of Bishops) 
 (for Chronology of Bishops) 
Moretti, Massimo, Antonio Maria Graziani e le fatiche della carriera. L'altare di famiglia a Sansepolcro e la commissione dell'"Assunta" a Palma il Giovane, in “Storia dell’arte”, [150], 2018, 2, pp. 18-67.
Moretti, Massimo, L'altare Graziani da Raffaello a Palma il Giovane. Una copia della "Madonna" Canossa e una "sentenza" sfavorevole a Giovanni De' Vecchi, in “Storia dell’arte”, [155-156], 2021, 1/2, pp. 61-87.
Moretti, Massimo, L'«ardentissimo desiderio di gloria e di honore»: una Battaglia di Lepanto di Federico Zuccari per Venezia, mai dipinta, nella corrispondenza di Antonio Maria Graziani, in L’Archivio di Caravaggio. Studi in onore di don Sandro Corradini'', a cura di Pietro Di Loreto, Foligno, Etgraphiiae, 2021, pp. 203-214.

16th-century Italian Roman Catholic bishops
17th-century Italian Roman Catholic bishops
Bishops appointed by Pope Clement VIII
1537 births
1611 deaths
Apostolic Nuncios to the Republic of Venice